Colus bukini is a species of sea snail, a marine gastropod mollusk in the family Colidae, the true whelks and the like.

Distribution
This marine species occurs off the Kuril Islands at 1000-2000 m.

References

 Kantor Yu.I. (1984). "Volutopsius middendorffii" complex and description of Colus bukini sp.n. from inshore waters of Kurile Islands (Gastropoda, Buccinidae).

External links

Buccinidae
Gastropods described in 1984